This is a list of serving Generals of the People's Republic of China.

Top Commanders

Military of China
People's Republic of China